Jabuke i vino (Apples and wine) is a song by the Serbian and former Yugoslav band Zana from 1983 album Natrag na voz. It is performed in duet with first frontman of Bijelo Dugme, Željko Bebek.

Song 
Composition is written in A major. Music was written by Kikamac and Radovan II, arranged by Tini Vraga, while the lyrics were written by Marina Tucaković. It was huge hit along with Mladiću moj an Osećam i znam.

Music video 
The music video was released in 1984. It was directed by Zoran Amar.

Trivia 
Song was parodied by the first and former Crvena jabuka frontman Dražen Ričl.

References 

1983 songs
1983 singles
Jugoton singles